Hrafnagil (also known as Hrafnagilshverfi  and formerly Reykárhverfi ) is a small village in Eyjafjarðarsveit, northern Iceland, which in 2016 had 260 inhabitants.

In the village is a school and a community center. In the area, geothermal heat can be found and is used to heat houses and greenhouses.

References

Populated places in Northeastern Region (Iceland)